Morris Watts (born 1936) is a former American football player and coach. Until his retirement in 2016, he was the offensive coordinator and quarterbacks coach at Central Michigan University.  He previously served as the offensive coordinator at Miami University, having joined the RedHawks coaching staff in 2009 as the quarterbacks coach.  Morris served as the interim head coach at Michigan State University for the last three games of the 2002 season after Bobby Williams was fired, compiling a record of 1–2.

Morris served three stints at the offensive coordinator at Michigan State (1986–1990, 1992–1994, 1999–2002) and was an assistant coach at Drake University (1965–1971), the University of Louisville (1972), Indiana University (1973–1981), the University of Kansas (1982), Louisiana State University (1983, 1995–1998), and Mississippi State University (2003). He coached quarterbacks for the Birmingham Stallions of the United States Football League (USFL) from 1984 to 1985 and for the Tampa Bay Buccaneers of the National Football League (NFL) in 1991.  Before coming to Miami University, Watts spent two years at the offensive coordinator at Broken Arrow Senior High in Broken Arrow, Oklahoma.

Coaching career

Michigan State
Watts was the offensive coordinator at Michigan State Spartans during the George Perles era for eight seasons from 1986 to 1990 and 1992 to 1994.  He rejoined the Spartans as a member of Nick Saban's coaching staff and became the interim head coach in 2002 when Bobby Williams was fired after guiding a pre-season top 20 team to a 3–6 start.  During his brief stint as interim head coach, he was 1–2.  Following the season, he left the Michigan State football program for Mississippi State.  He also coached at LSU as an offensive coordinator in the late 1990s.

Mississippi State
Watts showed his dynamism when he was hired at Mississippi State by saying at his introduction, "We want to be an offense that is balanced.  Does that mean out of 100 plays we'll pass 50 times and run 50 times? No! We may throw 70 and run 30 or we may run 70 and throw 30. We'd like to spread the field and give our kids the best chance to win".  In 2003, the Bulldogs were 2–10.

Head coaching record

*Bobby Williams coached the first 9 games of the season.

References

External links
 Texas Southern profile

1936 births
Living people
American football running backs
Central Michigan Chippewas football coaches
Drake Bulldogs football coaches
Indiana Hoosiers football coaches
Kansas Jayhawks football coaches
LSU Tigers football coaches
Louisville Cardinals football coaches
Miami RedHawks football coaches
Michigan State Spartans football coaches
Mississippi State Bulldogs football coaches
Tampa Bay Buccaneers coaches
Texas Southern Tigers football coaches
Tulsa Golden Hurricane football players
United States Football League coaches
High school football coaches in Missouri
High school football coaches in Oklahoma
People from Seneca, Missouri